The fifth season of America's Best Dance Crew premiered on January 28, 2010. Similar to the live casting specials featured in the first two seasons, the first three episodes consisted of separate regional auditions before proceeding to the official national-level competition. Shane Sparks did not return as a judge this season, due to his arrest, and was replaced by Omarion in his only season as a judge. In the live finale, which aired on April 8, 2010, Poreotix was declared the winner.

Cast
For the fifth season of America's Best Dance Crew, auditions were held in six cities: Atlanta, Houston, Denver, Los Angeles, Boston, and New York City. Fifteen dance crews were selected and then categorized into three regions: South, East Coast, and West Coast. Following the regional competitions, the initial pool of dance crews was narrowed down to nine.

Results

: No crews were eliminated due to technical errors in voting.
: Blueprint Cru received immunity from the double-elimination for having the judges' favorite performance during the previous episode.
Key
 (WINNER) The dance crew won the competition and was crowned "America's Best Dance Crew".
 (RUNNER-UP) The dance crew was the runner-up in the competition.
 (IMM) The dance crew was immune from elimination.
 (IN) The dance crew was safe from elimination.
 (RISK) The dance crew was at risk for elimination.
 (OUT) The dance crew was eliminated from the competition.

Episodes

Episode 1: ABDC Regional Finals: The South
Original Airdate: January 28, 2010
The five top dance crews from the South, selected by Lil Mama, JC Chasez, and guest judge Hokuto Konishi from Quest Crew, competed to represent their region in the Season 5 opener. After the Bottom 3 was chosen, each crew had to face off in a dance battle to "Outta Control" by Baby Bash featuring Pitbull.

Safe: Swagger Crew, Jungle Boogie
Bottom 3: X-treme Motion, Royal Flush, Ghost
Eliminated: Ghost, X-treme Motion

Episode 2: ABDC Regional Finals: The East
Original Airdate: February 4, 2010
The five top dance crews from the East Coast, selected by Lil Mama and guest judge Kevin "KB" Brewer from the JabbaWockeeZ, auditioned for a chance to move on in the competition. After the Bottom 3 was chosen, the crews participated in a dance battle to "Hip Hop Is Dead" by Nas featuring will.i.am.

Safe: Saltare, Blueprint Cru
Bottom 3: draZtik, Legendary Seven, Static Noyze
Eliminated: Legendary Seven, draZtik

Episode 3: ABDC Regional Finals: The West
Original Airdate: February 11, 2010
The five top dance crews from the West Coast, selected by JC Chasez, Omarion, and guest judge Nichelle Thrower from We Are Heroes, performed for the opportunity to win a spot on the show. After the Bottom 3 was chosen, the crews battled each other to "Showdown" by The Black Eyed Peas.

Safe: Poreotix, Heavy Impact
Bottom 3: Blended Projekt, Hype 5-0, BreakEFX
Eliminated: Blended Projekt, BreakEFX

Episode 4: Chart Topper Challenge
Original Airdate: February 18, 2010
Each crew was assigned a hit song that served as inspiration for their dance routines. The lowest ranked crew in each region danced in a battle for 30 seconds each to "TiK ToK" by Kesha.

Safe: Poreotix, Heavy Impact, Jungle Boogie, Royal Flush, Blueprint Cru, Saltare
Bottom 3: Hype 5-0, Swagger Crew, Static Noyze
Eliminated: Swagger Crew

Episode 5: Music Video Challenge
Original Airdate: February 25, 2010
The eight remaining crews emulated popular music videos from the past decade, featuring videos from artists such as Britney Spears, Shakira, Rihanna, and Omarion.

Safe: Poreotix, Jungle Boogie, Static Noyze, Saltare, Heavy Impact, Hype 5-0
Bottom 2: Royal Flush, Blueprint Cru
Eliminated: Royal Flush

Episode 6: Lady Gaga Challenge
Original Airdate: March 4, 2010
The seven remaining crews choreographed routines inspired by Lady Gaga. There were no eliminations due to voting issues. At the end of the episode, the judges chose the crew with the best performance to receive immunity from the double-elimination next week.

Safe: Static Noyze, Blueprint Cru, Jungle Boogie, Heavy Impact, Hype 5-0, Poreotix, Saltare
Awarded Immunity: Blueprint Cru

Episode 7: Disco Challenge
Original Airdate: March 11, 2010
The seven remaining crews incorporated classic disco moves into their dance routines. In addition to the challenge, all the crews had to incorporate a lift into their routines. This week featured a double-elimination due to last week's non-elimination episode.

Safe: Blueprint Cru (immunity), Saltare, Poreotix, Hype 5-0
Bottom 3: Heavy Impact, Static Noyze, Jungle Boogie
Eliminated: Heavy Impact, Static Noyze

Episode 8: Usher Challenge
Original Airdate: March 18, 2010
The five remaining crews took inspiration from Usher's music videos. Usher himself gave each crew their challenges through video.

Safe: Jungle Boogie, Poreotix, Hype 5-0
Bottom 2: Blueprint Cru, Saltare
Eliminated: Saltare

Episode 9: Illusion Challenge
Original Airdate: March 25, 2010
Just like its predecessor in Season 3, the remaining four crews incorporated an illusion or magic act into their performance set. The crews kicked off the show with a group performance to "Take It Off" by Kesha with judge Lil Mama performing in the routine. Magician Franz Harary returned as the magic instructor for the crews.

Safe:  Hype 5-0, Poreotix
Bottom 2: Blueprint Cru, Jungle Boogie
Eliminated: Jungle Boogie

Episode 10: Hip-Hop Nation Challenge & Last Chance Challenge
Original Airdate: April 1, 2010
The three remaining crews demonstrated hip hop styles from across the country in the penultimate challenge of the season. For both challenges, the crews got to collaborate with producer Swizz Beatz.

Challenge #1: Hip-Hop Nation Challenge
The remaining crews displayed their mastery of hip hop styles from around the nation. One crew was eliminated halfway through the show. The crews received help from three guest ABDC alumni from past seasons. Each alumnus was assigned to one of the dance styles the crews were responsible for.

Safe: Blueprint Cru
Bottom 2: Poreotix, Hype 5-0
Eliminated: Hype 5-0

Challenge #2: Last Chance Challenge
The two finalists were given one last chance to perform before the lines opened for the final voting session of the season.

Episode 11: The Finale
Original Airdate: April 8, 2010
The eliminated crews returned and performed with the finalists for a regional collaboration. Instead of going head-to-head, Poreotix and Blueprint Cru teamed up for their last performance.

Winner: Poreotix
Runner-up: Blueprint Cru

Episode 12: Champions for Charity
Original Airdate: April 15, 2010
America's Best Dance Crew hosted a charity event featuring all five champions. The five crews opened up the show with a group performance to "All I Do Is Win" by DJ Khaled.

References

External links
 

2010 American television seasons
America's Best Dance Crew